Mario Sergio Ortiz Vallejos (28 January 1936 – 2 May 2006 in Santiago, Chile) was a Chilean footballer.

Career
Ortiz played club football for Palestino and Colo-Colo, where he won league titles in 1960 and 1963.

He played for the Chile national football team in the 1962 FIFA World Cup, where he played as a midfielder, as Chile achieved a third-place finish.

Personal life

He died in 2006.

References

1936 births
2006 deaths
Footballers from Santiago
Chilean footballers
Chile international footballers
1962 FIFA World Cup players
Club de Deportes Green Cross footballers
Club Deportivo Palestino footballers
Colo-Colo footballers
Luis Cruz Martínez footballers
Chilean Primera División players
Association football midfielders
20th-century Chilean people